Ties Kruize (born 17 November 1952) is a former field hockey player from the Netherlands. He competed at the 1972 and 1984 Olympic Games and finished in fourth and sixth place, respectively. He became world champion in 1973, European champion in 1983, and retired from international competition in 1986, after the Hockey World Cup in London.

Kruize played 202 international matches for the Netherlands, and scored a total number of 167 goals. He was famous for his penalty corner, just as his successor Floris Jan Bovelander was. His father Roepie Kruize also played for the Dutch national hockey team. Throughout his career Kruize played for HC Klein Zwitserland from The Hague. With his club he won eight Dutch titles in a row: from 1977 until 1984. Just like his brothers Hans and Hidde, and his father Roepie, the oldest of the Kruize brothers played club hockey for HC Klein Zwitserland from The Hague. His uncle Gerrit Kruize was also an Olympic field hockey player.

Superstars
Kruize participated in the televised all-around sports competition Superstars, winning the European edition in 1977 and 1979.

References

External links
 
Personal website

1952 births
Living people
Dutch male field hockey players
Olympic field hockey players of the Netherlands
Field hockey players at the 1972 Summer Olympics
Field hockey players at the 1984 Summer Olympics
Field hockey players from The Hague
HC Klein Zwitserland players
1978 Men's Hockey World Cup players